Latvia competed with eight competitors at the 2012 Summer Paralympics in London, United Kingdom from 29 August to 9 September 2012.

Medallists

Athletics 

Men's Track and Road Events

Men's Field Events

Women's Field Events

Equestrian

Swimming 

Men

See also
 Latvia at the 2012 Summer Olympics

References 

Nations at the 2012 Summer Paralympics
2012
Paralympics